"How's This Even Going Down?" is a single released by Jesus Jones in June 2016.  The single was released in electronic format as well as two different versions of a limited-edition 2-disc vinyl record. One version came in neon yellow and solid purple colors (150 copies), whereas the other came in blue and clear discs (350 copies).

Track listing
 How's This Even Going Down? (disc 1 side 1)
 Stripped (2016) (disc 1 side 2)
 Fall (disc 2 side 1, side 2 is blank)

External links 
 Jesus Jones

References

Jesus Jones songs
2016 songs